This is a list of Australian films scheduled for release in 2017.

2017

References

 2017 in Australia
 2017 in Australian television
 List of 2017 box office number-one films in Australia

2017
Lists of 2017 films by country or language
Films